Gerecse is a mountain range in north-western Hungary,  that belongs to the Transdanubian Mountains

Geography 
The range lies in the Central Transdanubian region and connects Vértes Hills with Pilis Mountains in Komárom-Esztergom County, between the town of Tatabánya and the Danube River. 
Gerecse occupies an area of 850 km2 (20,300 ha). The highest point is Nagy-Gerecse at 634 m. The main rock is limestone and chalk.

Biology 
Deciduous oak forests cover the lower slopes, with submontane species of Quercus, Carpinus, Fagus, and at higher altitudes karst scrub. The area is 70% forest, 5% scrubland, 10% grassland, and 15% artificial landscapes. Yearly sunshine duration is around 1,980 hours. The average annual temperature above the height of 350 meters is 9.5 C (in January -2,8 C). The average annual precipitation is 640 millimeters.

Gallery

See also
Transdanubian Mountains
Geography of Hungary

References

External links
 http://www.kektura.click.hu/keret.cgi?/OKT/szovegek/angol/tour_05.htm 
 gerecse.lap.hu 
 Gerecse 
 Gerecse barlangjai 
 Gerecsei Tájvédelmi Körzet 

Transdanubian Mountains
